A smart city is a technologically modern urban area that uses different types of electronic methods and sensors to collect specific data. Information gained from that data is used to manage assets, resources and services efficiently; in return, that data is used to improve operations across the city. This includes data collected from citizens, devices, buildings and assets that is processed and analyzed to monitor and manage traffic and transportation systems, power plants, utilities, water supply networks, waste, Criminal investigations, information systems, schools, libraries, hospitals, and other community services. Smart cities are defined as smart both in the ways in which their governments harness technology as well as in how they monitor, analyze, plan, and govern the city. In smart cities the sharing of data in not limited to the city itself but also includes businesses, citizens and other third parties that can benefit from various uses of that data. Sharing data from different systems and sectors creates opportunities for increased understanding and economic benefits.

The smart city concept integrates information and communication technology ('ICT'), and various physical devices connected to the Internet of things ('IoT') network to optimize the efficiency of city operations and services and connect to citizens. Smart city technology allows city officials to interact directly with both community and city infrastructure and to monitor what is happening in the city and how the city is evolving. ICT is used to enhance quality, performance and interactivity of urban services, to reduce costs and resource consumption and to increase contact between citizens and government. Smart city applications are developed to manage urban flows and allow for real-time responses. A smart city may therefore be more prepared to respond to challenges than one with a conventional "transactional" relationship with its citizens. Yet, the term itself remains unclear in its specifics and therefore, open to many interpretations. Many cities have already adopted some sort of smart city technology.

Terminology
Due to the breadth of technologies that have been implemented under the smart city label, it is difficult to distill a precise definition of a smart city. Deakin and Al Waer list four factors that contribute to the definition of a smart city:

 The application of a wide range of electronic and digital technologies to communities and cities.
 The use of ICT to transform life and working environments within the region.
 The embedding of such Information and Communications Technologies in government systems.
 The territorialisation of practices that brings ICT and people together to enhance the innovation and knowledge that they offer.

Deakin defines the smart city as one that utilizes ICT to meet the demands of the market (the citizens of the city), and states that community involvement in the process is necessary for a smart city. A smart city would thus be a city that not only possesses ICT technology in particular areas, but has also implemented this technology in a manner that positively impacts the local community.

Alternative definitions include:
 Business Dictionary, 6 Nov 2011: "A developed urban area that creates sustainable economic development and high quality of life by excelling in multiple key areas; economy, mobility, environment, people, living, and government. Excelling in these key areas can be done so through strong human capital, social capital, and/or ICT infrastructure."
Caragliu, Del Bo, & Nijkamp, 2011: “A city can be defined as smart when investments in human and social capital and traditional transport and modern ICT infrastructure fuel sustainable economic growth and a high quality of life, with a wise management of natural resources, through participatory governance.”
Department for Business, Innovation and Skills, UK 2013: "[T]he concept is not static: there is no absolute definition of a smart city, no end point, but rather a process, or series of steps, by which cities become more 'liveable' and resilient and, hence, able to respond quicker to new challenges."
European Commission: "A smart city is a place where traditional networks and services are made more efficient with the use of digital solutions for the benefit of its inhabitants and business."
Frost & Sullivan 2014: "We identified eight key aspects that define a smart city: smart governance, smart energy, smart building, smart mobility, smart infrastructure, smart technology, smart healthcare and smart citizen."
Giffinger et al. 2007: "Regional competitiveness, transport and Information and Communication Technologies economics, natural resources, human and social capital, quality of life, and participation of citizens in the governance of cities."
Indian Government 2015: "Smart city offers sustainability in terms of economic activities and employment opportunities to a wide section of its residents, regardless of their level of education, skills or income levels."
 Institute of Electrical and Electronics Engineers, 23 Apr 2019: "A smart city brings together technology, government and society to enable the following characteristics: a smart economy, smart mobility, a smart environment, smart people, smart living, smart governance."
 Paiho et al. 2022: Smart city is a city that uses technological solutions to improve the management and efficiency of the urban environment. Typically, smart cities are considered being advanced in six fields of actions, namely ‘smart government’, ‘smart economy’, ‘smart environment’, ‘smart living’, ‘smart mobility’ and ‘smart people’.
 Smart Cities Council, 1 May 2013 : "A smart city [is] one that has digital technology embedded across all city functions"

Characteristics 
It has been suggested that a smart city (also community, business cluster, urban agglomeration or region) uses information technologies to:
 Make more efficient use of physical infrastructure (roads, built environment and other physical assets) through artificial intelligence and data analytics in order to support a strong and healthy economic, social, cultural development.
 Engage effectively with local governance by use of open innovation processes and e-participation, improving the collective intelligence of the city's institutions through e-governance, with emphasis placed on citizen participation and co-design.
 Learn, adapt and innovate and thereby respond more effectively and promptly to changing circumstances by improving the intelligence of the city.

They evolve towards a strong integration of all dimensions of human intelligence, collective intelligence, and also artificial intelligence within the city. The intelligence of cities "resides in the increasingly effective combination of digital telecommunication networks (the nerves), ubiquitously embedded intelligence (the brains), sensors and tags (the sensory organs), and software (the knowledge and cognitive competence)".

These forms of intelligence in smart cities have been demonstrated in three ways

 Orchestration intelligence: Where cities establish institutions and community-based problem solving and collaborations, such as in Bletchley Park, where the Nazi Enigma cipher was decoded by a team led by Alan Turing. This has been referred to as the first example of a smart city or an intelligent community.
 Empowerment intelligence: Cities provide open platforms, experimental facilities and smart city infrastructure in order to cluster innovation in certain districts. These are seen in the Kista Science City in Stockholm and the Cyberport Zone in Hong Kong. Similar facilities have also been established in Melbourne and Kyiv.
 Instrumentation intelligence: Where city infrastructure is made smart through real-time data collection, with analysis and predictive modelling across city districts. There is much controversy surrounding this, particularly with regards to surveillance issues in smart cities. Examples of Instrumentation intelligence are those implemented in Amsterdam. This is realized through:
 A common IP infrastructure that is open to researchers to develop applications.
 Wireless meters and devices transmit information at the point in time.
 A number of homes being provided with smart energy meters to become aware of energy consumption and reduce energy usage.
 Solar power garbage compactors, car recharging stations and energy saving lamps.
Some major fields of intelligent city activation are:

According to David K. Owens, the former executive vice president of the Edison Electric Institute, two key elements that a smart city must have are an integrated communications platform and a "dynamic resilient grid."

Data collection 
Smart cities have been conceptualized using the OSI model of 'layer' abstractions.  Smart cities are constructed by connecting the city's public infrastructure with city application systems and passing collected data through three layers, the perception layer, the network layer and the application layer. City application systems then use data to make better decisions when controlling different city infrastructures. The perception layer is where data is collected across the smart city using sensors. This data could be collected through sensors such as cameras, RFID, or GPS positioning. The perception layer sends data it collects using wireless transmissions to the network layer. The network layer is responsible for transporting collected data from the perception layer to the application layer. The network layer utilizes a city's communication infrastructure to send data meaning it can be intercepted by attackers and must be held responsible for keeping collected data and information private. The application layer is responsible for processing the data received from network layer. The application layer uses the data it processes to make decisions on how to control the city infrastructure based on the data it receives.

Frameworks
The creation, integration, and adoption of smart city capabilities require a unique set of frameworks to realize the focus areas of opportunity and innovation central to smart city projects. The frameworks can be divided into 5 main dimensions which include numerous related categories of smart city development:

Technology framework
A smart city relies heavily on the deployment of technology. Different combinations of technological infrastructure interact to form the array of smart city technologies with varying levels of interaction between human and technological systems.

 Digital: A service oriented infrastructure is required to connect individuals and devices in a smart city. These include innovation services and communication infrastructure. Yovanof, G. S. & Hazapis, G. N. define a digital city as "a connected community that combines broadband communications infrastructure; a flexible, service-oriented computing infrastructure based on open industry standards; and, innovative services to meet the needs of governments and their employees, citizens and businesses."
Intelligent: Cognitive technologies, such as artificial intelligence and machine learning, can be trained on the data generated by connected city devices to identify patterns. The efficacy and impact of particular policy decisions can be quantified by cognitive systems studying the continuous interactions of humans with their urban surroundings.
Ubiquitous: A ubiquitous city provides access to public services through any connected device. U-city is an extension of the digital city concept because of the facility in terms of accessibility to every infrastructure.
Wired: The physical components of IT systems are crucial to early-stage smart city development. Wired infrastructure is required to support the IoT and wireless technologies central to more interconnected living. A wired city environment provides general access to continually updated digital and physical infrastructure. The latest in telecommunications, robotics, IoT, and various connected technologies can then be deployed to support human capital and productivity.
Hybrid: A hybrid city is the combination of a physical conurbation and a virtual city related to the physical space. This relationship can be one of virtual design or the presence of a critical mass of virtual community participants in a physical urban space. Hybrid spaces can serve to actualize future-state projects for smart city services and integration.
 Information city: The multiplicity of interactive devices in a smart city generates a large quantity of data. How that information is interpreted and stored is critical to Smart city growth and security.

Human framework
Smart city initiatives have measurable positive impacts on the quality of life of its citizens and visitors. The human framework of a smart city – its economy, knowledge networks, and human support systems – is an important indicator of its success.

 Creativity: Arts and culture initiatives are common focus areas in smart city planning. Innovation is associated with intellectual curiosity and creativeness, and various projects have demonstrated that knowledge workers participate in a diverse mix of cultural and artistic activities.
 Learning: Since mobility is a key area of Smart city development, building a capable workforce through education initiatives is necessary. A city's learning capacity includes its education system, including available workforce training and support, and its cultural development and exchange.
 Humanity: Numerous Smart city programs focus on soft infrastructure development, like increasing access to voluntary organizations and designated safe zones. This focus on social and relational capital means diversity, inclusion, and ubiquitous access to public services is worked in to city planning.
 Knowledge: The development of a knowledge economy is central to Smart city projects. Smart cities seeking to be hubs of economic activity in emerging tech and service sectors stress the value of innovation in city development.

Institutional framework
According to Mary Anne Moser since the 1990s, the smart communities movement took shape as a strategy to broaden the base of users involved in IT. Members of these Communities are people that share their interest and work in a partnership with government and other institutional organizations to push the use of IT to improve the quality of daily life as a consequence of different worsening in daily actions. John M. Eger said that a smart community makes a conscious and agreed-upon decision to deploy technology as a catalyst to solving its social and business needs. It is very important to understand that this use of IT and the consequent improvement could be more demanding without the institutional help; indeed institutional involvement is essential to the success of smart community initiatives. Again Moser explained that "building and planning a smart community seeks for smart growth"; smart growth is essential for the partnership between citizen and institutional organizations to react to worsening trends in daily issues like traffic congestion, school overcrowding and air pollution.

Technological propagation is not an end in itself, but a means to reinventing cities for a new economy and society. Smart city initiatives require co-ordination and support from the city government and other governing bodies for their success. As has been noted by Fleur Johns, the increasing and evolving use of data has significant implications at multiple levels of governance. Data and infrastructure include digital platforms, algorithms, and the embedding of information technology in the physical infrastructure of smart cities. Digital technology has the potential to be used in negative as well as positive ways, and its use is inherently political.  Care needs to be taken to ensure that the development of smart cities does not perpetuate inequalities and exclude marginalized groups in relation to gender, age, race, and other human characteristics.

The importance of these three different dimensions is that only a link among them can make possible the development of a real smart city concept. According to the definition of smart city given by Andrea Caragliu et al., a city is smart when investments in human/social capital and IT infrastructure fuel sustainable growth and enhance quality of life, through participatory governance.

Energy framework
Smart cities use data and technology to create efficiencies, improve sustainability, create economic development, and enhance quality of life factors for people living and working in the city. A variety of different datasets may need to be integrated to create a smart energy infrastructure. More formally, a smart city is: "An urban area that has securely integrated technology across the information ... and Internet of Things (IoT) sectors to better manage a city’s assets." Employment of smart technologies enables the more efficient application of integrated energy technologies in the city allowing the development of more self-sustaining areas or even Positive Energy Districts that produce more energy than consume.

A smart city is powered by "smart connections" for various items such as street lighting, smart buildings, distributed energy resources (DER), data analytics, and smart transportation. Amongst these things, energy is paramount; this is why utility companies play a key role in smart cities. Electric companies, working partnership with city officials, technology companies and a number of other institutions, are among the major players that helped accelerate the growth of America's smart cities.

Data Management framework
Smart cities employ a combination of data collection, processing, and disseminating technologies in conjunction with networking and computing technologies and data security and privacy measures encouraging the application of innovation to promote the overall quality of life for its citizens and covering dimensions that include: utilities, health, transportation, entertainment and government services.

Roadmap
A smart city roadmap consists of four/three (the first is a preliminary check) major components:

 Define exactly what is the community: maybe that definition can condition what you are doing in the subsequent steps; it relates to geography, links between cities and countryside and flows of people between them; maybe – even – that in some Countries the definition of City/community that is stated does not correspond effectively to what – in fact – happens in real life.
 Study the Community: Before deciding to build a smart city, first we need to know why. This can be done by determining the benefits of such an initiative. Study the community to know the citizens, the business's needs – know the citizens and the community's unique attributes, such as the age of the citizens, their education, hobbies, and attractions of the city.
 Develop a smart city Policy: Develop a policy to drive the initiatives, where roles, responsibilities, objective, and goals, can be defined. Create plans and strategies on how the goals will be achieved.
 Engage The Citizens: This can be done by engaging the citizens through the use of e-government initiatives, open data, sport events, etc.

In short, People, Processes, and Technology (PPT) are the three principles of the success of a smart city initiative. Cities must study their citizens and communities, know the processes, business drivers, create policies, and objectives to meet the citizens' needs. Then, technology can be implemented to meet the citizens' need, in order to improve the quality of life and create real economic opportunities. This requires a holistic customized approach that accounts for city cultures, long-term city planning, and local regulations."Whether to improve security, resiliency, sustainability, traffic congestion, public safety, or city services, each community may have different reasons for wanting to be smart. But all smart communities share common attributes—and they all are powered by smart connections and by our industry's smarter energy infrastructure. A smart grid is the foundational piece in building a smart community." – Pat Vincent-Collawn, chairman of the Edison Electric Institute and president and CEO of PNM Resources.

History 
Early conceptions of future smart cities were found in utopian works such as New Atlantis. The idea and existence of smart cities is relatively new.  Following in the path of "Wired Cities" and "Intelligent Cities", the concept of the smart city is focused on a city’s use of ICT in urban problem-solving.  The use of computational statistical analysis by the Community Analysis Bureau in Los Angeles in the late 1960's and the establishment by Singapore of the National Computer Board in 1981 are cited as among the earliest cybernetic interventions into urban planning.

IBM (which counts among its founding patents a method for mechanical tabulation of population statistics for the United States Census Bureau in 1897), launched its “Smarter Cities” marketing initiative in 2008. In 2010, Cisco Systems, with $25 million from the Clinton Foundation, established its Connected Urban Development program in partnership with San Francisco, Amsterdam, and Seoul.  In 2011, a Smart City Expo World Congress was held in Barcelona, in which 6000 people from 50 countries attended. The European Commission in 2012 established the Smart Cities Marketplace, a centralized hub for urban initiatives in the European Union.  
The 2015 Chancellor’s Budget for the United Kingdom proposed to invest £140 million in the development of smart cities and the Internet of Things (IoT).

In 2021, The People's Republic of China took first in all categories of the International AI City Challenge, demonstrating the national commitment to smart city programs – "by some estimates, China has half of the world’s smart cities".  As time goes on the percentage of smart cities in the worlds will keep increasing, and by 2050, up to 70% of the world's population is expected to inhabit a city.

Policies
ASEAN Smart Cities Network (ASCN) is a collaborative platform which aims to synergise Smart city development efforts across ASEAN by facilitating cooperation on smart city development, catalysing bankable projects with the private sector, and securing funding and support from ASEAN's external partners.

The European Union (EU) has devoted constant efforts to devising a strategy for achieving 'smart' urban growth for its metropolitan city-regions. The EU has developed a range of programmes under "Europe's Digital Agenda". In 2010, it highlighted its focus on strengthening innovation and investment in ICT services for the purpose of improving public services and quality of life. Arup estimates that the global market for smart urban services will be $400 billion per annum by 2020.

The Smart Cities Mission is a retrofitting and urban renewal program being spearheaded by the Ministry of Urban Development, Government of India. The Government of India has the ambitious vision of developing 100 cities by modernizing existing mid-sized cities.

Technologies

Smart grids are an important technology in smart cities. The improved flexibility of the smart grid permits greater penetration of highly variable renewable energy sources such as solar power and wind power.

Mobile devices (such as smartphones and tablets) are another key technology allowing citizens to connect to the smart city services.

Smart cities also rely on smart homes and specifically, the technology used in them.

Bicycle-sharing systems are an important element in smart cities.

Smart mobility is also important to smart cities.

Intelligent transportation systems and CCTV systems are also being developed.

Digital libraries have been established in several smart cities.

Online collaborative sensor data management platforms are on-line database services that allow sensor owners to register and connect their devices to feed data into an on-line database for storage and allow developers to connect to the database and build their own applications based on that data.

Additional supporting technology and trends include remote work, telehealth, the blockchain, fintech, online banking technology,

Electronic cards (known as smart cards) are another common component in smart city contexts. These cards possess a unique encrypted identifier that allows the owner to log into a range of government provided services (or e-services) without setting up multiple accounts. The single identifier allows governments to aggregate data about citizens and their preferences to improve the provision of services and to determine common interests of groups. This technology has been implemented in Southampton.

Retractable bollards allow to restrict access inside city centers (i.e. to delivery trucks resupplying outlet stores). Opening and closing of such barriers is traditionally done manually, through an electronic pass but can even be done by means of ANPR cameras connected to the bollard system.

Energy Data Management Systems (EDMS) can help to save cities energy by recording data and using it to increase efficiency.

Cost-benefit analysis of smart city technologies
Cost-benefit analysis has been done into smart cities and the individual technologies. These can help to assess whether it is economically and ecologically beneficial to implement some technologies at all, and also compare the cost-effectiveness of each technology among each other

Commercialization
Large IT, telecommunication and energy management companies such as Apple, Baidu, Alibaba, Tencent, Huawei, Google, Microsoft, Cisco, IBM, and Schneider Electric launched market initiatives for intelligent cities.

 Baidu is working on Apollo, a self-driving technology
 Alibaba has created the City Brain
 Tencent is working on medical technology, such as WeChat Intelligent Healthcare, Tencent Doctorwork, and AI Medical Innovation System (AIMIS)
 Huawei has its Safe City Compact Solution which focuses on improving safety in cities
 Google's subsidiary Sidewalk Labs is focusing on smart cities
 Microsoft has CityNext
 Cisco, launched the global "Intelligent Urbanization" initiative to help cities using the network as the fourth utility for integrated city management, better quality of life for citizens, and economic development. 
 IBM announced its Smarter Cities Challenge to stimulate economic growth and quality of life in cities and metropolitan areas with the activation of new approaches of thinking and acting in the urban ecosystem. 
 Schneider Electric is working on EcoStruxure
 Sensor developers and startup companies are also continually developing new smart city applications.

Research
University research labs developed prototypes for intelligent cities. 
 IGLUS is an action research project led by EPFL focused on developing governance systems for urban infrastructures. IGLUS announced a MOOC through Coursera.
 MIT Smart Cities Lab focuses upon intelligent, sustainable buildings, mobility systems (GreenWheel electric bicycle, mobility on demand, CityCar, Wheel Robots); 
 the IntelCities research consortium for electronic government, planning systems and citizen participation; URENIO developed intelligent city platforms for the innovation economy focusing on strategic intelligence, technology transfer, collaborative innovation, and incubation, while it promotes intelligent cities research and planning;
 the Smart Cities Academic Network is working on e-governance and e-services in the North Sea region. 
 The MK:Smart project is focusing on issues of sustainable energy use, water use and transport infrastructure alongside exploring how to promote citizen engagement alongside educating citizens about smart cities.
 Laboratory for AI, Machine Learning, Business & Data Analytics (LAMBDA) at Tel Aviv University focuses on Digital Life, Smart Transportation and Human Mobility Patterns in smart Cities.
 Research journals in this area include the UK IET Smart Cities, which was launched in 2018.

Criticism

The criticisms of smart cities revolve around:
 The high level of big data collection and analytics has raised questions regarding surveillance in smart cities, particularly as it relates to predictive policing and abuse by law enforcement. 
 A bias in strategic interest may lead to ignoring non-ICT centered modes of promising urban development.
 A smart city, as a scientifically planned city, would defy the fact that real development in cities is often haphazard and participatory. In that line of criticism, the smart city is seen as unattractive for citizens as they "can deaden and stupefy the people who live in its all-efficient embrace".  
 The focus of the concept of smart city may lead to an underestimation of the possible negative effects of the development of the new technological and networked infrastructures needed for a city to be smart.
 As a globalized business model is based on capital mobility, following a business-oriented model may result in a losing long-term strategy: "The 'spatial fix' inevitably means that mobile capital can often 'write its own deals' to come to town, only to move on when it receives a better deal elsewhere. This is no less true for the smart city than it was for the industrial, [or] manufacturing city."
In the smart city environment there are many threats that affect the privacy of individuals. The technology is involved in scanning, identification, checking the current location, including time and direction of movement. Residents may feel that they are constantly monitored and controlled.
 As of August 2018, the discussion on smart cities centers around the usage and implementation of technology rather than on the inhabitants of the cities and how they can be involved in the process.
Especially in low-income countries, smart cities are irrelevant to the urban population which lives in poverty with limited access to basic services. A focus on smart cities may worsen inequality and marginalization.
If a smart city strategy is not planned for people with accessibility problems, such as persons with disabilities affecting mobility, vision, hearing, and cognitive function, the implementation of new technologies could create new barriers.
Digitalization can have a significant environmental footprint and there is potential for the externalization of environmental costs onto outside communities.
Smart city can be used as a slogan only for land revenue generation, especially in the Global South.

See also

 Carfree city
 Career-oriented social networking market
 Connected car
 Community-driven development
 Eco-cities
 Energy informatics
 Global brain
 Government by algorithm
 Intelligent environment
 Intelligent transportation system
 Municipal wireless network
 Net metering
 Pervasive informatics
 Planned community
 Resilient city
 Short food supply chains
 Smart grid
 Smart highway
 Smart port
 Smart village
 Sustainable city
 Ubiquitous computing
 Urban computing
 Urban farming
 Urban informatics
 Urban vitality
 Vertical farming
 Mass surveillance

References

Further reading

External links
 British Standards Institute initiative on Smart Cities
 Future of Cities UK government 'Foresight' project on cities

 
Urban studies and planning terminology
Government by algorithm